When a Woman Breaks Her Jewel Box is a 1971 South Korean film directed by Kim Soo-yong. It was awarded Best Film at the Blue Dragon Film Awards ceremony.

Name
The title of the film is a reference to anointment of jesus christ at bethany in matthew 14:3-9, where a woman poured perfume in her alabaster jar. The title was chosen as the protagonist let go of the past and make a new start.

Synopsis
Bo-yeong, young woman living with her father Hyongsik and aunt Yeseon, believes that her mother was killed during the Korean War. She discovers that her mother is still not dead, but, after having been raped by an American soldier, has dedicated her life to taking care of orphans.

Cast
Yoon Jeong-hee-plays the role of Bo-yeong Yoon.
 Hong Se-mi-role of Younghee the secretary at the orphanage
Nam Kung Won-Hyong-sik, the father of Bo-yeong
 Sa Mi-ja- Role of Ye-seon,Bo-yeong's aunt
 Yoon Yang-ha-plays Hyosup, the fiancee of Bo-yeong
 Chai Jung-hoon-Kyong-il, Detective who is formerly an orphan
 Lee Hoon -Kwak Chang su,formerly an orphan
 Park Am-Doctor, who is a friend of Hyong-sik
 Jeon Young-ju - Mother of Kyong-ae
 Ko Seol-bong- Senior inspector
 Kim Hye-ri 
 Kim Ki-bum

Legacy
The film is significant for its earliest examples of negative portrayal of American forces stationed in South Korea in South Korean cinema.The film addresses the issue of sexual assault by Americans, a topic that has been ignored in south korean popular media until the 1960s.

Bibliography

English

Korean

Notes

External links 

1971 films
Best Picture Blue Dragon Film Award winners
1970s Korean-language films
Films directed by Kim Soo-yong
South Korean war drama films
1970s war drama films